Wessex Poems and Other Verses (often referred to simply as Wessex Poems) is a collection of fifty-one poems set against the bleak and forbidding Dorset landscape by English writer Thomas Hardy.  It was first published in London and New York in 1898 by Harper Brothers, and contained a number of illustrations by the author himself.

Reception
The collection met a broadly hostile reception, critics being accustomed to Hardy as a (controversial) writer of prose alone. Hardy himself was taken aback by the failure to recognise his dry humour, as in the (slightly bawdy) 'Bride-Night Fire'.

On a more personal note, his wife Emma disliked the section consisting of love lyrics to various recipients; and especially 'The Ivy Wife', which she felt aimed at her.

Notable poems
Two notable early poems from the collection (1860s) were "Hap" and 'Amabel' - the latter exploring the theme of sexual attraction impacted by age taken up by The Well-Beloved. 'She at His Funeral' was a tribute to Hardy's friend Horace Moule; while the bitter "Neutral Tones" and the cheerful 'Sergeant's Song' show further aspects of Hardy's range of poetic subjects.

See also
 1898 in poetry
 Thomas Hardy's Wessex

References

External links

 The complete Wessex Poems and Other Verses
 

1898 poetry books
English poetry collections
Poetry by Thomas Hardy
Victorian poetry
Wessex